The 1999 SEAT Open Luxembourg singles was the singles event of the ninth edition of the most prestigious women's tennis tournament held in Luxembourg. Mary Pierce was the defending champion but she did not compete in this year.

Qualifier Kim Clijsters won in the final, 6–2, 6–2, against top playing seed Dominique Van Roost, to win her first WTA title.

Seeds

Draw

Finals

Top half

Bottom half

Qualifying

Seeds

Qualifiers

Qualifying draw

First qualifier

Second qualifier

Third qualifier

Fourth qualifier

References
 ITF singles results page

SEAT Open Luxembourg - Singles
Luxembourg Open
1999 in Luxembourgian tennis